Sir Jonathan Robert Montgomery is a British legal scholar who specialises in health care law. He is Professor of Health Care Law at University College London.

Professor Montgomery was chair of the Nuffield Council on Bioethics, the leading UK bioethics committee, from 2012 to 2017. He was appointed Chair of the Health Research Authority in 2012. He was replaced by Professor Sir Terence Stephenson on 1 September 2019.

In March 2017 he became a member of the European Group on Ethics (EGE), which is the leading European bioethics committee He is a regular contributor to items in the media, including the BBC and broadsheet newspapers, and has given evidence to the UK Parliament.

In December 2018, he was appointed Chair of the Oxford University Hospitals NHS Foundation Trust.

He was appointed a Knight Bachelor in the 2019 New Year Honours for services to Bioethics and to Healthcare Law.

Books
 Health Care Law (2nd edition, Oxford University Press, 2002)

References 

Year of birth missing (living people)
Living people
People educated at King's College School, London
Knights Bachelor
Academics of University College London
National Health Service people
Fellows of the Academy of Medical Sciences (United Kingdom)
Alumni of Gonville and Caius College, Cambridge
Academics of the University of Southampton